Giovanni Crociata (born 11 August 1997) is an Italian professional footballer who plays as a midfielder for  club Cittadella, on loan from Empoli.

Club career
On 20 January 2021, he joined Empoli on loan. Empoli were obligated to purchase his rights in case of promotion to Serie A. Empoli was promoted at the end of the season.

On 31 August 2021 he joined SPAL on a season-long loan. 

On 1 September 2022, Crociata was loaned to Südtirol for the season. On 10 January 2023, he was sent on a new loan to Cittadella.

Career statistics

Club 
Updated 15 August 2021

References

1997 births
Living people
Italian footballers
Footballers from Palermo
Italy youth international footballers
Serie A players
Serie B players
Brescia Calcio players
A.C. Milan players
F.C. Crotone players
A.C. Carpi players
Empoli F.C. players
S.P.A.L. players
F.C. Südtirol players
A.S. Cittadella players
Association football midfielders